Will Eaves (born, 1967) is a British writer, poet and professor at the University of Warwick.

Early life 
Eaves was born in Bath, Somerset. He was educated at Beechen Cliff School before going up to King's College, Cambridge to read English.

Career 
Will Eaves was the Arts Editor at The Times Literary Supplement from 1995 to 2011. His most recent novel Murmur – a book about the inner workings of Alan Turing – brought him much critical acclaim. For Murmur, Eaves was shortlisted for the Goldsmiths Prize and won the Wellcome Book Prize. It was only the third novel to win the award for science-related writing.

Bibliography 
As author

Fiction

 Will Eaves (2001). The Oversight. Picador.
 Will Eaves (2005). Nothing To Be Afraid Of. Picador.
 Will Eaves (2006). Small Hours. Brockwell Press.
 Will Eaves (2011). Sound Houses. Carcanet Press.
 Will Eaves (2012). This is Paradise. Picador.
 Will Eaves (2015). The Absent Therapist. Penguin UK.
 Will Eaves (2016). The Inevitable Gift Shop. CB Editions.
 Will Eaves (2018). Murmur. CB Editions.

References

External links 

 Will Eaves on The Guardian
 Will Eaves on The Spectator

1967 births
Living people
People from Bath, Somerset
People educated at Beechen Cliff School
Alumni of King's College, Cambridge
Academics of the University of Warwick
British poets
Wellcome Book Prize
21st-century British novelists
21st-century British short story writers
British science writers